Myotubularin-related protein 3 is a protein that in humans is encoded by the MTMR3 gene.

This gene encodes a member of the myotubularin dual specificity protein phosphatase gene family. The encoded protein is structurally similar to myotubularin but in addition contains a FYVE domain and an N-terminal PH-GRAM domain. The protein can self-associate and also form heteromers with another myotubularin related protein. The protein binds to phosphoinositide lipids through the PH-GRAM domain, and can hydrolyze phosphatidylinositol(3)-phosphate and phosphatidylinositol(3,5)-biphosphate in vitro. The encoded protein has been observed to have a perinuclear, possibly membrane-bound, distribution in cells, but it has also been found free in the cytoplasm. Multiple transcript variants encoding different isoforms have been found for this gene.

References